Cyperus colymbetes is a species of sedge that is native to eastern parts of Africa.

See also 
 List of Cyperus species

References 

colymbetes
Plants described in 1867
Taxa named by Theodor Kotschy
Taxa named by Johann Joseph Peyritsch
Flora of Mozambique
Flora of Madagascar
Flora of Kenya
Flora of Sudan
Flora of Uganda
Flora of Tanzania